Aharon of Karlin  may refer to:

Aharon of Karlin (I) (1738–1771), founder of the Karlin-Stolin Hasidic dynasty
Aharon of Karlin (II) (1802–1872), his grandson

See also
Karlin-Stolin (Hasidic dynasty)